Competition Authority, the name given to a competition regulator in certain countries, may refer to:

Competition Authority (Albania)
Competition Authority (Ireland)
Jersey Competition Regulatory Authority
Netherlands Competition Authority
Norwegian Competition Authority